Club de Fútbol Lorca Deportiva is a Spanish football club based in Lorca, in the autonomous community of the Region of Murcia. Founded in 2012, it plays in Tercera División RFEF – Group 13, holding home games at Estadio Francisco Artés Carrasco, with an 8,100-seat capacity.

History
The club was founded after the dissolution of Lorca Atlético in 2012, by supporters who did not support La Hoya Lorca CF, as this team was based in the hamlet of La Hoya.

In its first season, despite being registered in Segunda Autonómica, the seventh division, it played one level above after filling a vacant place. After two promotions in three seasons, Lorca Deportiva made its debut in Tercera División in 2015. The club won the league but could not achieve promotion to Segunda División B. But it the next season the club finally managed to promote to the next category, Segunda División B.  

In the 2018–19 season the club finished 2nd in the Group 13 of the Tercera División, but failed to promote to Segunda División B in the promotion playoffs. On July 11, 2019 Iván Urbano was appointed the new head coach of the club.

Season to season

2 seasons in Segunda División B
4 seasons in Tercera División
1 season in Tercera División RFEF

Current squad
}

References

External links
Official website

Lorca, Spain
Football clubs in the Region of Murcia
Association football clubs established in 2012
2012 establishments in Spain
Phoenix clubs (association football)